The DFB-Pokal 2013–14 was the 34th season of the cup competition, Germany's second-most important title in women's football.

Participating clubs
The following teams qualified for the DFB-Pokal:

R. As runners-up, winner already qualified.

Results

First round
The draw for the first round was held on 12 July 2013. The eight best clubs of the previous Bundesliga season were awarded byes for the first round. As in previous years, the first round is drawn in northern and a southern group separately.

Second round
24 winners of the previous round join eight clubs with a bye in the first round. Draw was held on 8 September with a northern and southern section separately.

Round of 16
Draw was held on 5 October.

Quarterfinals
Three teams from the second league remain. The draw was held on 19 November 2013.

Semifinals
Sand was still representing the second Bundesliga, leading it at the time of draw.

Final
The final was played on 17 May 2014 in Köln. Essen reached the final for the first time in their club history.

Top scorers

References

Women
Pok
2013-14